Seminole Cafe and Hotel is an historic building located at 55 South Flagler Avenue in Homestead, Florida, United States.

The building was originally a theater in Miami.  In 1916, it moved to Homestead and converted into a hotel and cafe, changing its name to the Landmark Hotel. On July 10, 2008, it was added to the U.S. National Register of Historic Places.

References

External links

National Register of Historic Places in Miami-Dade County, Florida
Homestead, Florida
Hotel buildings completed in 1916
1916 establishments in Florida